The Casados House, in Rio Arriba County, New Mexico near Los Ojos, New Mexico, was built in 1885.  It was listed on the National Register of Historic Places in 1985.

It is a two-story "mansion" built with  adobe walls upon a stone rubble foundation.

"7. Description; Stone rubble foundation, stucco and mud
plaster over 20" adobe walls, end boards-front; asphalt
shingles over hipped roof; small enclosed overhang; 1/6, 2/2
double hung windows with segmental arched molding pediments;
single door with transom; boxed chamfered porch posts with
spindle railings and stick/cut-out frieze. Front and side
facades symmetrical. Center hall flanked by load bearing
adobe walls and two pairs of rooms on both floors
Barn, ca. 50' SW: hewn horizontal log with alternating
half dovetail joint (1st floor), plank with corrugated metal
roof (2nd floor), small railroad tie addition.
Located just above the drop-off from the first plateau to
the river, in the vicinity of mobile homes, recent houses and
a scattering of historic buildings (see #52)."

"8. Significance ; This is the best preserved of the two-story
mansions remaining in the survey area; another stands in ruins
(ill. 55), two more in Tierra Amarilla outside the survey
area. Built in the mid-1880s by Hispanic merchants who had
prospered with the coming of the railroad, these represent an
adoption of Anglo-American tastes and house design on the most
refined and grand scale affordable. This house, like the
others, has an overriding symmetry of massing, full front
porch, centered entrance and center hall plan with four
matching square rooms on each floor. The doors, windows and
balustrades are stock elements shipped in over the railroad.
The segmental molding window pediments, the stick and cut-out
friezes, the boxed chamfered posts and the concentration of
those posts to mark the centered entrance show the hand of a
local builder."

A barn, also built around 1885, is a second contributing building in the listing, and is "a good
example of the typical combination of Hispanic (hewn logs) with Anglo (plank and corrugated roofing) elements in local barns."

References

National Register of Historic Places in Rio Arriba County, New Mexico
Houses completed in 1885
Houses in Rio Arriba County, New Mexico